is a private university in Hagi, Yamaguchi, Japan. The school was first established as a junior women's college in 1967. It became a co-ed four-year college in 1999.

External links
 Official website 

Educational institutions established in 1967
Private universities and colleges in Japan
Universities and colleges in Yamaguchi Prefecture